Statistics of Ekstraklasa for the 2000–01 season.

Overview
16 teams competed in the 2000–01 season. Wisła Kraków won the championship.

League table

Results

Relegation playoffs 
The matches were played on 20 and 24 June 2001.

Top goalscorers

References

External links
 Poland – List of final tables at RSSSF 

Ekstraklasa seasons
Poland
1